The Old Christ Church Lutheran (Old Hollandaise Lutheran Church) was a former Lutheran congregation in North America, located in Washington Heights in Manhattan, New York City, founded in 1750 after breaking off from Trinity Lutheran Church.  The two congregations reunited in 1784 as The United German Lutheran Churches in New York City, but still referred to as Christ and old Trinity. The two united congregations began sharing the St. Matthew's Church structure in 1822 while keeping separate names. This continued until the name ceased in 1838 and the congregation was just called the Evangelical Lutheran Church of St. Matthew. The present New York Lutheran church of the same name, Christ Church was founded much later after the Old Christ Church name was no longer used.

History
German members succeeded from the German and Dutch Trinity Lutheran Church in 1750 founding Christ Church after purchasing and adaptively reusing a brewery on Cliff Street as a church. In 1767, the congregation built a church at Frankfort and William Streets, later known as The Old Swamp Church.  In 1784, Christ Church Lutheran unites with Trinity Lutheran Church as The United German Lutheran Churches in New York City. With merger, services are held in the former Christ Church building. The Trinity Church had been destroyed in 1776 and not rebuilt.

An English-language Lutheran church is founded and built in 1822 on Walker Street, at the east end of Broadway, called Saint Matthew's Church. Always in debt, it is sold in 1826 for $22,750.00 after The United German Lutheran Churches in New York City refuses to aid St. Matthew's. Shortly thereafter the building was resold at the same price to The United German Lutheran Churches in New York City, referred to as Christ and old Trinity. The congregation maintains both buildings with Christ Church speaking German and St. Matthew's Church speaking English. The former Christ Church is sold in 1831 and the congregation meets in St. Matthew's until 1838 when the congregation assumes the name St. Matthew's. The former Christ Church building was demolished thereafter.

References 

Bibliography

External links
 Official Website

Dutch-American culture in New York City
German-American culture in New York City
Religious organizations established in 1750
18th-century Lutheran churches in the United States
Demolished churches in New York City
Demolished buildings and structures in Manhattan
Lutheran churches in New York (state)
Former Lutheran churches in the United States
Churches in Manhattan
1750 establishments in the Province of New York